An election was held on November 2, 2010 to elect all 41 members to Delaware's House of Representatives. The election coincided with the elections for other offices, including U.S. Senate, U.S. House of Representatives and state senate. The primary election was held on September 14, 2010.

Democrats consolidated their control of the House with a net gain of two seats, winning 26 seats compared to 15 seats for the Republicans.

Results

Statewide

District
Results of the 2010 Delaware House of Representatives election by district:

References

House of Representatives
Delaware House of Representatives
2010